The Great Mosque of Muhammad Ali Pasha or Alabaster Mosque is a mosque situated in the Citadel of Cairo in Egypt and was commissioned by Muhammad Ali Pasha between 1830 and 1848.

Situated on the summit of the citadel, this Ottoman mosque, the largest to be built in the first half of the 19th century, is, with its animated silhouette and twin minarets, the most visible mosque in Cairo.

The mosque was built in memory of Tusun Pasha, Muhammad Ali's eldest son, who died in 1816.

This mosque, along with the citadel, is one of the landmarks and tourist attractions of Cairo and is one of the first features to be seen when approaching the city from any direction.

History

The mosque was built on the site of old Mamluk buildings in Cairo's Citadel between 1830 and 1848, although not completed until the reign of Said Pasha in 1857. The architect was Yusuf Boshnak from Istanbul and its model was the Sultan Ahmed Mosque in that city. The ground on which the mosque was erected was built with debris from the earlier buildings of the Citadel.

Before completion of the mosque, the alabastered panels from the upper walls were taken away and used for the palaces of Abbas I. The stripped walls were clad with wood painted to look like marble. In 1899, the mosque showed signs of cracking and some inadequate repairs were undertaken. The condition of the mosque became so dangerous that a complete scheme of restoration was ordered by King Fuad in 1931 and was finally completed under King Farouk in 1939.

Muhammad Ali Pasha was buried in a tomb carved from Carrara marble, in the courtyard of the mosque. His body was transferred here from Hosh al-Basha in 1857.

Architecture

Muhammad Ali chose to build his state mosque entirely in the architectural style of his former overlords, the Ottomans, unlike the Mamluks who, despite their political submission to the Ottomans, stuck to the architectural styles of the previous Mamluk dynasties.

The mosque was built with a central dome surrounded by four small and four semicircular domes. It was constructed in a square plan and measured 41x41 meters. The central dome is 21 meters in diameter and the height of the building is 52 meters. Two elegant cylindrical minarets of Turkish type with two balconies and conical caps are situated on the western side of the mosque, and rise to 82 meters.

The use of this style, combined with the presence of two minarets and multiple half-domes surrounding the central dome — features reserved for mosques built on the authority of the Sultan — were a defiant declaration of de facto Egyptian independence.

The main material is limestone likely sourced from the Great Pyramids of Giza but the lower storey and forecourt is tiled with alabaster up to 11,3 meters. The external facades are severe and angular and rise about four storeys until the level of the lead-covered domes.

The mihrab on the southeastern wall is three storeys high and covered with a semicircular dome. There are two arcades on the second storey, rising on columns and covered with domes. Although there are three entrances on each side of the forecourt, the usual entry is through the northeastern gate. The forecourt measures 50x50 meters. It is enclosed by arched riwaks rising on pillars and covered by domes.

There is a monumental tower clock in the middle of the northwestern riwak, which was presented to Muhammad Ali by King Louis Philippe of France around 1836–1840. The clock was reciprocated with the obelisk of Luxor now standing in Place de la Concorde in Paris. It is a very simple tower clock with three trains, and no remontoire.

The interior has a measure of 41x41 meters and gives a great feeling of space. The use of two levels of domes gives a much greater sense of space than there actually is. The central dome rises on four arches standing on colossal piers. There are four semicircular domes around the central dome. There are four smaller domes on the corners as well. The domes are painted and embellished with motifs in relief. The walls and pillars are covered with alabaster up to 11 meters high.

Gallery

See also
 Lists of mosques
 List of mosques in Africa
 List of mosques in Egypt
 List of mosques in Cairo
 Islamic art
 Islamic architecture
 Ottoman architecture
 List of mausolea

References

External links

Mosques in Cairo
Ottoman mosques in Egypt
Alabaster
Mosque buildings with domes
Religious buildings and structures completed in 1848
1848 establishments in Egypt
19th-century religious buildings and structures in Egypt